WAPI or Wapi may refer to:

Broadcasting
 WAPI (AM), a radio station licensed to Birmingham, Alabama, US
 WJQX (former call sign WAPI-FM), a radio station licensed to Helena, Alabama, US
 WVTM-TV (former call sign WAPI-TV), a television station licensed to Birmingham, Alabama, US

Other uses
 Mathilda Batlayeri Airport (ICAO code), Indonesia
 Wapi Rural LLG, a local-level government in Papua New Guinea
 WLAN Authentication and Privacy Infrastructure, a Chinese national standard for wireless LANs
 Workflow APIs and interchange formats, a specification from the Workflow Management Coalition (WfMC)
 World Association of Professional Investigators, a professional association based in the UK